Bajirao Mastani is a 2015 Indian epic historical romance film directed and scored by Sanjay Leela Bhansali. It was a co-production between Bhansali Productions and Eros International. The film stars Ranveer Singh as Bajirao I, Deepika Padukone as Mastani, and Priyanka Chopra as Kashibai. Tanvi Azmi, Aditya Pancholi, Vaibbhav Tatwawdi and Milind Soman playing supporting roles. The screenplay was written by Prakash R. Kapadia, and the cinematography provided by Sudeep Chatterjee. Based on the Marathi novel Raau by Nagnath S. Inamdar, the film narrates the story of the Maratha Peshwa Bajirao and his second wife Mastani.

The film garnered awards and nominations in a variety of categories with particular praise for Bhansali's direction and music, the performances of Chopra and Singh, its cinematography, art direction, and costume design.

At the 63rd National Film Awards, Bajirao Mastani received seven awards including Best Director for Bhansali, Best Supporting Actress for Azmi, Best Cinematography for Chatterjee, and Best Art Direction. It received the most nominations at the 61st Filmfare Awards with fourteen. Bajirao Mastani went on to win more awards than any other film at the ceremony with nine including Best Film, Best Director for Bhansali, Best Actor for Singh, and Best Supporting Actress for Chopra. The film received thirteen nominations at the 2015 Producers Guild Film Awards including Best Film, and Best Actress in a Leading Role for both Chopra, and Padukone. It won nine awards, the most at the ceremony, including Best Director for Bhansali, Best Actor for Singh, and Best Supporting Actress for Azmi. Bajirao Mastani received thirteen nominations at the 22nd Screen Awards including Best Film, and Best Director for Bhansali, and won seven including Best Actor for Singh, and Best Supporting Actress for Chopra. The film also won a leading thirteen awards (from seventeen nominations) at the 17th IIFA Awards including Best Director for Bhansali, Best Actor for Singh, and Best Supporting Actress for Chopra.

Accolades

See also
 List of Bollywood films of 2015

Footnotes

References

External links
 Accolades for Bajirao Mastani at the Internet Movie Database

Lists of accolades by Indian film